Lyon County is a county in the U.S. state of Minnesota. As of the 2020 census, the population was 25,269. Its county seat is Marshall.

Lyon County comprises the Marshall, MN Micropolitan Statistical Area.

History
The county was established by two acts of the Minnesota state legislature, dated March 6, 1868, and March 2, 1869. The county seat was designated as Marshall. The county was named for Nathaniel Lyon, an Army officer who served in the Dakota and Minnesota territories before being killed in the Civil War in 1861. He had achieved the rank of general by his death. The county was much larger until an act passed on March 6, 1873, made the western 43% the new Lincoln County.

Geography
The Yellow Medicine River flows northeast through the upper portion of the county, the Redwood River flows northeast through the central part, and the Cottonwood River flows northeast through the lower part. The county's terrain consists of low rolling hills, etched by drainages and gullies. It slopes to the north and east, with its highest point near its southwest corner, at 1,729' (527m) ASL.

Lakes

 Clear Lake
 Cottonwood Lake
 Dead Coon Lake
 East Twin Lake
 Goose Lake
 Island Lake
 Lady Slipper Lake
 Lake Marshall
 Lake of the Hill
 Lake Yankton
 Lone Tree Lake (part)
 Long Lake (part)
 McKay Lake
 North Twin Lake
 Rock Lake
 School Grove Lake (part)
 Sham Lake
 South Twin Lake
 Swift Lake
 West Twin Lake
 Wood Lake

Major highways

  U.S. Highway 14
  U.S. Highway 59
  Minnesota State Highway 19
  Minnesota State Highway 23
  Minnesota State Highway 68
  Minnesota State Highway 91

Airports
 Southwest Minnesota Regional Airport (MML)
 Tracy Municipal Airport (TKC)

Adjacent counties

 Yellow Medicine County - north
 Redwood County - east
 Murray County - south
 Pipestone County - southwest
 Lincoln County - west

Protected areas

 Camden State Park
 Gadwall State Wildlife Management Area
 Garvin State Park
 Grandview State Wildlife Management Area
 Greenhead State Wildlife Management Area
 Glynn Prairie Scientific and Natural Area
 Shelburne State Wildlife Management Area
 Vallers State Wildlife Management Area

Demographics

2000 census
As of the 2000 census, there were 25,425 people, 9,715 households, and 6,334 families in the county. The population density was 35.6/sqmi (13.7/km2). There were 10,298 housing units at an average density of 14.4/sqmi (5.56/km2). The racial makeup of the county was 93.58% White, 1.49% Black or African American, 0.31% Native American, 1.67% Asian, 0.02% Pacific Islander, 1.89% from other races, and 1.04% from two or more races. 3.97% of the population were Hispanic or Latino of any race. 33.9% were of German, 15.5% Norwegian and 10.5% Belgian ancestry.

There were 9,715 households, out of which 33.00% had children under the age of 18 living with them, 55.10% were married couples living together, 7.10% had a female householder with no husband present, and 34.80% were non-families. 27.90% of all households were made up of individuals, and 12.40% had someone living alone who was 65 years of age or older. The average household size was 2.49 and the average family size was 3.09.

The county population contained 26.20% under the age of 18, 13.30% from 18 to 24, 26.50% from 25 to 44, 19.50% from 45 to 64, and 14.60% who were 65 years of age or older. The median age was 34 years. For every 100 females there were 95.70 males. For every 100 females age 18 and over, there were 93.20 males.

The median income for a household in the county was $38,996, and the median income for a family was $48,512. Males had a median income of $32,102 versus $21,445 for females. The per capita income for the county was $18,013. About 6.30% of families and 10.10% of the population were below the poverty line, including 10.00% of those under age 18 and 12.70% of those age 65 or over.

2020 Census

Communities

Cities

 Balaton
 Cottonwood
 Florence
 Garvin
 Ghent
 Lynd
 Marshall (county seat)
 Minneota
 Russell
 Taunton
 Tracy

Unincorporated communities

 Amiret
 Burchard
 Dudley
 Green Valley

Townships

 Amiret Township
 Clifton Township
 Coon Creek Township
 Custer Township
 Eidsvold Township
 Fairview Township
 Grandview Township
 Island Lake Township
 Lake Marshall Township
 Lucas Township
 Lynd Township
 Lyons Township
 Monroe Township
 Nordland Township
 Rock Lake Township
 Shelburne Township
 Sodus Township
 Stanley Township
 Vallers Township
 Westerheim Township

Politics
Lyon County has been a traditional Republican stronghold. In only one national election since 1980 has the county selected the Democratic Party candidate (as of 2020).

See also
 National Register of Historic Places listings in Lyon County, Minnesota

References

External links

 Lyon County government website

 
Minnesota counties
1868 establishments in Minnesota
Populated places established in 1868